Archery New Zealand Inc. is the national governing body for the sport of Archery in New Zealand as recognised by the World Archery Federation.

Championships
The 2011 indoor championships for Archery New Zealand was held at Arena Manawatu's B & M Centre, with competitions for best compound archer and best recurve (Olympic bow) archer, with the competition divided between women and men, along with a division of ages between masters, seniors, cadet boys, and cub boys.

References

External links
 Official Website

Archery
Archery in New Zealand
New Zealand